is a former Japanese competitive figure skater. He is a two-time World bronze medalist (2002, 2003), two-time Four Continents champion (1999, 2003), and six-time Japanese national champion.

Personal life
Takeshi Honda was born on 23 March 1981 in Kōriyama, Fukushima, Japan. He plays the piano.

Career
Honda began short track speed skating at the age of six with his brother and switched to figure skating at nine. At 12, when he entered junior high school, he moved to Sendai to train with Hiroshi Nagakubo. Although he started the training somewhat late, he caught up very quickly and was, at 14, the youngest senior national champion in Japan ever.

In December 1997, Honda left Japan to train with Galina Zmievskaya at the International Skating Center in Simsbury, Connecticut. He represented Japan at the 1998 Winter Olympics in Nagano, where he finished 15th. Following the 1998 Skate Canada International, Honda moved to Barrie, Ontario, Canada to work with Doug Leigh. He became the first Four Continents champion in history when he won the inaugural event in 1999.

In 2002, Honda won the bronze medal at the 2002 World Championships and finished in 4th place at the Winter Olympics. He was the first male skater from Japan to medal at the World Championships since Minoru Sano took the bronze in 1977. Honda withdrew from the 2005 World Championships after injuring his ankle in a fall during the qualifying segment.

Honda ended his competitive career and turned to show skating in March 2006. He is also a TV commentator. He resides in Takatsuki city, Osaka to coach Daisuke Takahashi (as a technical coach) and Kansai University Skating club. He also coached Mai Asada.

Programs

Results
GP: Champions Series/Grand Prix

References

External links

 

Figure skaters at the 2002 Winter Olympics
Japanese male single skaters
Living people
1981 births
Olympic figure skaters of Japan
Sportspeople from Fukushima Prefecture
World Figure Skating Championships medalists
Four Continents Figure Skating Championships medalists
World Junior Figure Skating Championships medalists
Asian Games medalists in figure skating
Figure skaters at the 2003 Asian Winter Games
Medalists at the 2003 Asian Winter Games
Asian Games gold medalists for Japan
Figure skating commentators
Figure skaters at the 1998 Winter Olympics